The Big Fellah is a play by Richard Bean about Irish-Americans in New York. The premier production is an Out of Joint and Lyric Hammersmith production, directed by Max Stafford-Clark and starting on 2 September 2010.

Plot summary
The play is set in New York in 1972, where young fireman Michael Doyle decides to join the IRA to live up to his Irish heritage. Costello, the "Big Fellah" recruits Michael, wanting to use his apartment in The Bronx as a safe house for an escaped killer. As the play continues, it is clear that someone in their circle is leaking information and can not be trusted.

Creative Team
Directed by Max Stafford-Clark
Designed by Tim Shortall
Lighting by Jason Taylor
Sound by Nick Manning

References

2010 plays
Fiction set in 1972
Plays set in New York City
Plays set in the 1970s
Irish-American history
Plays by Richard Bean